Music of Jammu and Kashmir reflects a rich musical heritage and cultural legacy of the Indian union territory of Jammu and Kashmir. Two different regions of Jammu and Kashmir, consists upper Jammu Division and Kashmir Valley.  Music of Kashmir Valley is closer to Central Asian music while music from Jammu region is similar to that of other regions of North India.

Kashmir

Chakri
Chakri is one of the most popular types of traditional music played in Jammu & Kashmir. Chakri is a responsorial song form with instrumental parts, and it is played with instruments like the harmonium, the rubab, the sarangi, the nout, the geger, the tumbaknaer and the chimta. It is performed in folk and religious spheres, by the Muslim and Hindu kashmiris. Chakri was also used to tell stories like fairy tales or famous love stories such as Yousuf-Zulaikha, Laila-Majnun, etc. Chakri ends with the rouf, though rouf is a dance form but few ending notes of Chakri which are played differently and on fast notes is also called Rouf. It is a very important part of the Henna Night (Ma'enzi raat) during weddings.

Henzae
Henzae is a traditional and ancient form of singing which is practiced by Kashmiri Pandits at their festivals. It appears to have archaic features that suggest it is the oldest form of Kashmiri folk singing.

Rouf or Wanwun

Rouf is a traditional dance form usually performed by women on certain important occasions like marriage and other functions and also in cultural activities.

Ladishah

Ladishah is one of the most important parts of the Kashmiri music tradition. Ladishah is a sarcastic form of singing. The songs are sung resonating to the present social and political conditions and are utterly humorous. The singers move from village to village performing generally during the harvesting period. The songs are composed on the spot on issues relating to that village, be it cultural, social or political. The songs reflect the truth and that sometimes makes the song a bit hard to digest, but they are totally entertaining.

Sufiana Kalam (Kashmiri classical)
The dance based on the sofiyiana kalam is the hafiz nagma.

Hindustani classical
Music and musical instruments find mention in the earliest texts like the Nilmatapurana and Rajatarangini by Kalhana. The very fact that it was a Kashmiri, Abhinavagupta (the great philosopher), who wrote a commentary called Abhinavabharati on Bharata's Natyashatra shows how much importance was given to music in the ancient times. A favorite traditional instrument is the santoor (Shat-tantri-veena), a hundred string percussion instrument which is played by the goddess Sharada (the goddess of learning and art in ancient Kashmir).

Notable santoor players from Jammu and Kashmir include Shivkumar Sharma, from Jammu, and Bhajan Sopori from the Kashmir Valley.

Jammu region
Music in Jammu is mainly in Dogri language, Gujari language, Pahari language and Punjabi language. Traditional Dogri folk song is known as Bhakh.

See also
 Jammu and Kashmir (union territory)
 Culture of Kashmir
 Outline of Jammu and Kashmir

References

External links
 Official Site

Culture of Jammu and Kashmir
Indian culture
Indian music